Baastad is a surname. Notable people with the surname include:

Babbis Friis-Baastad (1921–1970), Norwegian children's writer
Einar Friis Baastad (1890–1968), Norwegian football player
Helge Leiro Baastad (born 1960), Norwegian businessperson
Lena Rådström Baastad (born 1974), Swedish politician

See also 
Friis-Baastad Peak, is one of the ice-free peaks at the south side of Frostlendet Valley, situated 1 nautical mile (2 km) southeast of the Mana Mountain in the Borg Massif of Queen Maud Land, Antarctica